The Rousse TV Tower is a 204-metre-high TV tower built of reinforced concrete at Rousse, Bulgaria. Originally, the structure was constructed as a 206-metre-high TV tower with a cafe/restaurant on top and was the tallest one on the Balkan peninsula until 2001. In the 1990s an additional antenna was added bringing the height to 210 metres. And, in March 2007, the antenna was reconstructed bringing its height to 204 metres.

The Rousse TV Tower was built on the Leventa Hill, in 1986 and was launched on 7 May 1987 (under communist rule). Authors of the project were Stilyan Titkov, Evlogi Tsvetkov, Ivan Yantahtov and V. Vasilev. The newly built tower started broadcasting both Bulgarian Television and Soviet Television, as well as the three stations of Bulgarian National Radio – Horizont, Hristo Botev, and Orpheus. Higher frequencies were coming into use during the following years, and the process of shutting down old transmitters was completed on 15 Aug 2004.

The tower had an observation deck open for tourists at a height of 107 metres, which offered a panoramic view of Rousse, the Danube river, the neighbouring city of Giurgiu, Romania, and as far as the Carpathian Mountains.

See also 
 List of towers
 List of tallest structures in Bulgaria

Notes

External links 
 Pictures and description in Bulgarian
 Comparison of the Rousse and Endem TV towers
 Comparison of TV towers in Bulgaria

Gallery 

Towers in Bulgaria
TV Tower
Towers completed in 1987
1987 establishments in Bulgaria